Jack Swart (born 1954) is a former New Zealand road cyclist. 
 
In the 1978 Commonwealth Games he competed in the 4000m team pursuit, coming 2nd for silver; and the 4000m individual pursuit. .

In the 1982 Commonwealth Games he competed in the Team time trial, coming 3rd for bronze; and the Road Race, coming 15th.

He was not chosen for the 1984 Summer Olympics despite a world-class performance in the Coors International in Colorado, the selectors apparently regarded him as  a tour rider not an individual racer despite having won two New Zealand road championships.

He was described as "the blond-haired giant of New Zealand cycling for the best part of a decade through to 1986". Swart and Blair Stockwell were the only two riders to win the "Dulux North Island Tour" three times.

He was born in Tuakau to a dairy farmer from the Netherlands; his younger brother Stephen Swart was also a champion road cyclist.

Honorific eponym
Swart Lane, in the Hamilton suburb of Chartwell, is named in Jack Swart's honour.

References

External links
 

Living people
1954 births
New Zealand male cyclists
Commonwealth Games silver medallists for New Zealand
Commonwealth Games bronze medallists for New Zealand
Cyclists at the 1978 Commonwealth Games
Cyclists at the 1982 Commonwealth Games
People from Tuakau
Commonwealth Games medallists in cycling
Sportspeople from Waikato
20th-century New Zealand people
Medallists at the 1978 Commonwealth Games
Medallists at the 1982 Commonwealth Games